Alyona Vladimirovna Torganova (born 14 May 1980) is a singer, ex-member of Russian girls band Reflex (2002–2016).

Biography
Alyona was born on 14 May 1980 in Kurchatov, Kazakhstan SSR. She has a younger brother and sister.

She graduated from Moscow State Art and Cultural University, a specialist in show business and management.

In parallel with her studies she was engaged in choreography, she danced in Moscow clubs.

Career
Choreographer, backing vocalist and dancer of the Reflex  since 2002. In 2013, the blades of scenic winds cut Torganova phalanx of the finger. In the Moscow clinic Alyona immediately sewn a severed finger.

On 25 March 2016 announced the departure of the group.

Alyona repeatedly entered the hundred of the most beautiful girls in Russia according to MAXIM.

Discography

Albums
with Reflex
 2002 — Go Crazy
 2002 — I Will Always Wait for You
 2002 — This is Love
 2003 — Non Stop
 2005 — Lyrics. I Love.
 2005 — Pulse
 2006 — Harem (Lounge feat. Chillout remixes)
 2008 — Blondes 126
 2014 — Memories
 2015 — Adult Girls

References

External links
 
 
 Playlist: группа Reflex

Living people
Russian rock singers
Russian pop singers
1980 births
People from East Kazakhstan Region
21st-century Russian singers
21st-century Russian women singers
Russian choreographers
Russian female dancers